Fast Forward was Australia's highest-rating and most critically awarded commercial television sketch comedy show, broadcast for 90 one-hour episodes from 12 April 1989 to 26 November 1992.

The show was produced by Steve Vizard, who was also the executive producer, writer and performer, and starred Jane Turner, Gina Riley, Magda Szubanski (the three of whom went on to star in Kath & Kim), Marg Downey, Michael Veitch, Peter Moon, Alan Pentland, Steve Blackburn, Geoff Brooks, Ernie Dingo, the Rubbery Figures satirical puppets, and numerous guests and supporting stars, such as Gerry Connolly and Bryan Dawe.

Fast Forward was succeeded by the related series Full Frontal, and subsequently Totally Full Frontal, which were broadcast from 1993 to 1999. Full Frontal had a different main cast, but many of the Fast Forward cast guest starred.

Fast Forward was directed by Ted Emery. From its second series onward, Andrew Knight joined Steve Vizard and Ted Emery as executive producers of the show. They went on to establish the leading Australian production house, Artist Services.

All four seasons plus five 'best of' compilations of Fast Forward have been released on DVD. All four seasons were re-released in 2010.

In 2013, the Network Ten-owned channel, One, began airing half-hour-long specials titled Fast Forward Funniest Send-Ups which first aired in 1994, making it the first time the show has been shown since 1998.

Background
Many of the stars came from a 1985 Seven Network sketch comedy pilot called The Eleventh Hour, which also spawned The Comedy Company, via The D-Generation. Fast Forward was commissioned by Seven in late 1988. It was produced by Vizard's production company, United Film Completion, and broadcast on Seven Network. There were a number of working titles for the show, including Snapped Cable Television, as well as Fast Forward.

Style

Fast Forward was noted for its fast-paced satirical comedy which particularly lampooned the media, in particular film and TV, with its parodies of well-known television shows (such as Kung Fu, Lost In Space, The Munsters, and A Current Affair), personalities (such as Clive James, Jana Wendt, Derryn Hinch and Geoffrey Robertson) and commercials (such as for American Express and Nescafé).

Its subjects were also Australian politics, which it attacked through various political impersonations (including John Howard and Paul Keating), and also using the political puppets, Rubbery Figures, previously seen in small segments on the ABC, based on Peter Nicholson's political cartoons.

Another key distinguishing feature was the use of simulated channel surfing to switch from sketch to sketch, often in the middle of a sketch, sometimes after the punchline. Particularly a sketch would abruptly switch to a momentary segment of static, followed by another sketch, simulating the effect of the viewer repeatedly switching channels. The channel-surfing device became a distinctive hallmark of the show that helped move quickly from sketch to sketch.

The television and multimedia subject matter of the sketches, pace, style and devices were real points of difference from predecessor sketch comedy shows of the time, particularly earlier shows such as The Mavis Bramston Show, The Naked Vicar Show, Australia You're Standing In It, The D-Generation and The Comedy Company, Fast Forward was more media-focused and parody-focused; a real difference, and the binding force for the whole show, was the now-famous channel-changing device. The white noise and on-screen static that represented the channel change became the modern television equivalent of a curtain being drawn at an old-fashioned vaudeville show.

Fast Forward was also well known for its musical parodies, particularly of current music video clips. Some of the better-known music parodies included ABBA, Cher and Dannii Minogue.

Sketches and content

Each episode of Fast Forward featured regular characters, a news-based segment, a major parody of a well-known television show or film, lampoons of television commercials, political satire, particularly in a segment using the Rubbery Figures political puppets.

Some of the most memorable regular characters included

•	Marg Downey: SBS Presenter

•	Magda Szubanski: Pixie-Ann Wheatley; Chenille the Beautician (with Marg Downey as Janelle); the Ugly Couple (with Peter Moon)

•	Steve Vizard and Peter Moon: Advertising executives, Brent Smythe and Barry; Indian Rug Fakari salesmen Roger Ramshet and Abdul

•	Michael Veitch: gay flight attendants (with Steve Vizard); Kelvin Cunnington; Redmond Herring

•	Gerry Connolly: the Queen; Joh Bjelke-Petersen

•	Jane Turner: Russian news presenter Sveter (with Peter Moon as Victor)

•	Steve Vizard: Darren Hunch (parody of Derryn Hinch)

•	Ernie Dingo: Robert Gottliebsen

•	Steve Blackburn and Geoff Brooks: Arthur and Wayne Dodgy (dodgy salesmen who previously appeared in Australia You're Standing In It)

•	Michael Veitch and Glenn Robbins: The Whizz Bang Theatre Company

Some of the most memorable sketches included "Dumb Street", a parody of Home and Away and Neighbours; and a lampoon of Skippy. In one memorable sketch that went to air, Moon and Vizard were both visibly trying to contain their laughter through a series of insults in one of their parodies of Kung Fu.

The political puppets Rubbery Figures were made more "commercial" than on the ABC by inserting them into popular situations outside the political Canberra environment. This led to the Star Trek parody where Paul Keating was Mr. Spock and Bob Hawke was Captain Kirk. Rubbery Figures was a huge hit and a crucial element in the early success of Fast Forward.

In 1991, there were five Thomas the Tank Engine & Friends skits featuring Ertl Thomas models. These segments involved people complaining about Sodor not having female steam engines, the Fat Controller polluting the countryside by pouring purple slime out of the tankers, drunken punks, the engines going on strike, and the engines getting replaced. In these skits, Thomas would do some human things, such as eating breakfast, writing, and going away for the weekend.
Percy was referred to as Bertie two times in the first sketch, Gordon at the end of the fourth, and Henry one time in the fifth. The sketches had five original engine characters, Crazy Bartholomew the Loco Locomotive, who was a Thomas model painted yellow, Alfred, who was a Percy model painted red (he was even referred to as Percy at the start of the fifth sketch), Damian the Diesel, who isn't seen in person, Edgar, who is a mentioned engine character, and one of the female engines, who was a Percy model painted orange with additional detailing. Toby was also mentioned once at the end of the first sketch, and so was Clarabel once in the fourth sketch.

The full-length TV or movie parodies which were "stripped" through each the one-hour episodes were:

1989 Series

 Episode 1 The Midday Show with Don Lane and Jana Wendt, Burke's Backyard
 Episode 3 Friday the 13th, Geoffrey Robertson's Hypothetical
 Episode 5 The 1989 Logie Awards
 Episode 7 A Night on Manhattan, Batman
 Episode 11 The Towering Poseidon Tidal Earthquake '1977
 Episode 12 Candid Camera
 Episode 13 Beijing TV News
 Episode 15 Tell the Truth
 Episode 16 The Cosby Show, Batman, Beijing TV news
 Episode 17 Batman, MTV
 Episode 18 The Addams Family
 Episode 19 Casablanca
 Episode 20 Get Smart
 Episode 21 Hogan's Heroes
 Episode 22 Lost in Space

1990 Series

 Episode 1 Kung-Fu
 Episode 2 Hawaii Five-O, Tonightly Live with Steve Vizard
 Episode 3 A Country Practice
 Episode 4 The Beverly Hillbillies, Four Corners
 Episode 5 The Golden Girls, Beach Party Massacre
 Episode 6 Happy Days
 Episode 7 New Faces
 Episode 8 The Flintstones
 Episode 9 I Dream of Jeannie, NBC Today Show
 Episode 10 Doctor Who
 Episode 11 The Adventures of Superman, Donahue
 Episode 12 Prisoner, Floyd on Australian Cooking
 Episode 13 Play School, Mister Ed
 Episode 14 Sale of the Century, That's Dancing
 Episode 15 The Patty Duke Show
 Episode 16 Sale of the Century, James Bond Goldfinger
 Episode 17 Perry Mason
 Episode 18 Bonanza, Seven Samurai
 Episode 19 Fantasy Island, Dick Smith
 Episode 20 Skippy, Bewitched, Wheel of Fortune
 Episode 21 The Partridge Family
 Episode 22 The Sullivans
 Episode 23 Voyage to the Bottom of the Sea, To the Manor Born
 Episode 24 Gilligan's Island
 Episode 25 Cleopatra/The Fall of the Roman Empire, Agatha Christie
 Episode 26 Pride and Prejudice, The Munsters

1991 Series

 Episode 1 M*A*S*H
 Episode 3 Family Feud
 Episode 4 Batman, Thomas the Tank Engine & Friends
 Episode 5 Star Trek
 Episode 6 Donahue
 Episode 7 Are You Being Served?
 Episode 8 Miami Vice
 Episode 9 The Adventures of Robin Hood
 Episode 10 Blind Date
 Episode 11 The Six Million Dollar Man
 Episode 12 Dallas
 Episode 13 The Poseidon Adventure
 Episode 14 I Love Lucy
 Episode 15 Dracula
 Episode 16 Skippy, Embassy
 Episode 17 Sherlock Holmes and The Hound of the Baskervilles
 Episode 18 Charlie's Angels
 Episode 19 Petticoat Junction
 Episode 20 Alien, All Creatures Great and Small
 Episode 21 Lost in Space
 Episode 22 Fantastic Voyage
 Episode 23 Indiana Jones and the Temple of Doom
 Episode 24 Oprah, Young Talent Time
 Episode 25 Miss Teen USA
 Episode 26 The Midday Show, The Saturday Show

1992 Series

 Episode 1 Star Wars, The Dating Game, 60 Minutes
 Episode 2 The Flying Nun, Flipper, The Book Show, Dumb Street
 Episode 3 Apocalypse Now, America's Funniest Bloopers, Backchat, Amazing Stories, A Current Affair
 Episode 4 Frankenstein, Mother and Son, Donahue
 Episode 5 Hard Copy, Godzilla, New Faces, The Book Show, Edith Piaf
 Episode 6 The Movie Show, Burke's Backyard, The Hunt for Red October, Four Corners
 Episode 7 Picnic at Hanging Rock, Four Corners
 Episode 8 The Wizard of Oz, Joseph and the Amazing Technicolor Dreamcoat
 Episode 9 The Rocky Horror Picture Show, Strictly Ballroom, The Good, the Bad and the Ugly, Sylvania Waters
 Episode 10 Gone With the Wind, Sylvania Waters
 Episode 11 Casablanca, Open University, Sylvania Waters
 Episode 12 Chariots of Fire, Psycho, Romeo and Juliet
 Episode 13 King Kong, Blood Frenzy Massacre 2, 4 Corners
 Episode 14 E.T.
 Episode 15 Blake's 7, The Saturday Show
 Episode 16 Play School, The Sound of Music

Cast
Regular cast members comprised:

 Geoff Brooks
 Jane Turner
 Magda Szubanski
 Marg Downey
 Michael Veitch
 Peter Moon
 Steve Blackburn
 Ernie Dingo (1989)
 Steve Vizard (1989–1991)
 Bryan Dawe (1990)
 Alan Pentland (1990–1992, recurring previously)
 Gina Riley (1990–1992)
 Brendan Luno (1991, recurring previously)
 Gerry Connolly (1991, recurring previously)
 Glenn Robbins (1991–1992, recurring previously)

Guest stars included:
 Alan Pentland (1989)
 Bryan Dawe (1989)
 Jane Hopkins (1989)
 John Deeks (1989)
 Ivan Hutchinson (1989)
 Bert Newton (1989)
 Kevin Carlin (1989)
 Jonathon Coleman (1989)
 Stephen Kearney (1989)
 Julian McMahon (1989)
 Rita Rudner (1989)
 Paul Jennings (1989-1990)
 Brendan Luno (1989, 1990, 1992)
 Alan Fletcher (1990)
 Michelle McClatchy (1990)
 Mandy Salomon (1990)
 Paul Grabowsky (1990)
 Allan Border (1990)
 John Farnham (1990)
 Barry Jones (1990)
 Gerry Connolly (1990, 1992)
 Glenn Robbins (1991, Episodes 3.1-3.13)
 Crowded House (1991, Episode 3.8)
 Stephen Curry (1991)
 Glenn Butcher (1991)
 The Umbilical Brothers (1991)
 Greg Keyes (1991)
 John McEnroe (1991)
 Geire Kami (1991-1992)
 Andrew Maj (1992)
 Matt Hayden (1992)
 Matt Tilley (1992)
 Bill Oddie (1992)
 David Bradshaw (1992)
 Peter Cummins (1992)
 Beverley Dunn (1992)
 Rachel Griffiths (1992)
 Paula Gardner (1992)
 Lisa McCune (1992)
 Frank Woodley (1992)
 Jeffrey Richards (1992)

Awards and ratings

Fast Forward consistently won the ratings for all of its 90 episodes, generally rating in the mid- to high 30s.

In 1990, Fast Forward won two Logie awards; it also received two Australian Television awards (Penguins) for Excellence in Make-up and Achievement in Production. Also in 1990, the company was bestowed with two AWGIES, the Australian Writers' Guild Awards; one for Fast Forward for best Comedy/Revue/Sketch and the other for Vizard, Co-writer Best Sketch Comedy – Fast Forward. The Variety Club awarded Vizard Comedy Artist Of The Year and Rolling Stone magazine awarded him Television Performer of the Year.

At the 1991 Logie Awards Steve Vizard won the Gold Logie for Most Popular Personality on Australian Television. Vizard also won Most Popular Male Light Entertainer. Magda Szubanski won Most Popular Female Light Entertainer and Fast Forward was awarded Most Popular Light Entertainment Program. Also in 1991, the Fast Forward writing team won an AWGIE for Best Sketch Comedy for Fast Forward.

At the 1992 Logies, Magda Szubanski once again picked up the award for Most Popular Female Performer – Light Entertainment and Fast Forward received the Logie for Most Popular Light Entertainment Program. The Australian Writers Guild presented an AWGIE to Fast Forward for Best Sketch Comedy. Fast Forward also picked up a People's Choice Award for Most Popular Program on Australian Television.

The following year, 1993, Fast Forward won a Logie for Most Popular Comedy Program. The production team and cast decided in late 1992, despite offers to renew from Channel 7, to end the program 'on a high', feeling that they did not want it to go downhill and tarnish its legacy as one of Australia's best-ever sketch comedy shows.

ARIA Music Awards
The ARIA Music Awards are a set of annual ceremonies presented by Australian Recording Industry Association (ARIA), which recognise excellence, innovation, and achievement across all genres of the music of Australia. They commenced in 1987.

! 
|-
| 1990 || Fast Forward - Take One || ARIA Award for Best Comedy Release ||  || 
|-

Albums releases

DVD releases

Fast Forward In Rewind: Funniest Moments Vol. 1 (2-disc set) – 24 April 2004
Fast Forward In Rewind: Funniest Moments Vol. 2 (2-disc set) – 12 May 2004
Fast Forward: Funniest TV Send Ups: Vol. 1 – 22 March 2005
Fast Forward: Funniest TV Send Ups: Vol. 2 – 24 June 2005
Fast Forward: Funniest TV Send Ups: Vol. 3 – 1 July 2005
Fast Forward: The Complete Season 1 (5-disc box set) – 20 March 2006
Fast Forward: The Complete Season 2 (6-disc box set) – 23 October 2006
Fast Forward: The Complete Season 3 (6-disc box set) – 5 December 2006
Fast Forward: The Complete Season 4 (5-disc box set) – 18 January 2008
Fast Forward: Series 1 (6-disc set) – 22 March 2010
Fast Forward: Series 2 (6-disc set) – 22 March 2010
Fast Forward: Series 3 (6-disc set) – 8 June 2010
Fast Forward: Series 4 (5-disc set) – 8 June 2010

Specials
 Fast Forward Exposed (20 April 1993, 45 minutes)
 A Royal Commission into the Australian Economy (5 May 1993, 90 minutes)
 38 and a Bit Fabulous Years of Australian Television (13 February 1994, 60 minutes)
 The Making of Nothing (20 February 1994, 60 minutes)
 Standing on the Road (1994, 60 minutes)
 Fast Forward Rewind (4 July 1994, 60 minutes)
 Fast Forward's Funniest TV Send-Ups (1994, 12 half-hour episodes)
 Fast Forward's Funniest Moments (1998, 12 one-hour episodes)
 Ten-Year Bash (October 2002, 48 minutes)
 One More Round (2003, 60 minutes)
 Dragging up the Past (2003, 60 minutes)

Adaptation

The show was adapted for German television under the name "Switch" by order of TV station ProSieben. It was aired for the first time in 1997.

References

External links
 
Fast Forward at the National Film and Sound Archive
The Unofficial Fast Forward Guide

1989 Australian television series debuts
1992 Australian television series endings
Seven Network original programming
Australian television sketch shows
Australian television shows featuring puppetry
Television series about television
English-language television shows
Television shows set in Melbourne